A bungalow is a small house or cottage that is either single-story or has a second story built into a sloping roof.

Bungalow or The Bungalow may also refer to:

Film and TV
Bungalow (film), a 2002 German film
"The Bungalow", an episode in the 4th season of the TV series Dynasty, 1981

Places
Bungalow, Queensland, a suburb of Cairns
The Bungalow, an institution for "half-caste" Aboriginal children and some adults between 1914 and 1960 in Alice Springs, Northern Territory, Australia
The Bungalow, Isle of Man, a vantage point on the Snaefell Mountain Course, Isle of Man
Bungalow railway station

See also
Bungalow 2, a 2007 novel by Danielle Steel
 Bungalow 8, a former nightclub chain
Bungalow 13, a 1948 American crime drama film
 Bungalow 702, a heritage-listed house on Christmas Island, Australia
 Bungalow court, a style of multi-family housing developed in Pasadena, California, in the 1910s
 Bungalow Heaven, Pasadena, California, a neighbourhood
The Bungalow on the Beach, a 17th-century house built by the Governor of Danish India, now a hotel, in Tharangambadi,  Tamil Nadu, India.
The Bungalow Mystery (1930), a novel in the Nancy Drew series